Landévennec Abbey is a Benedictine monastery at Landévennec in Brittany, in the department of Finistère, France. The present monastery is a modern foundation at the site of an early mediaeval monastery, of which only ruins survive.

First foundation 
The abbey is traditionally held to have been founded around 490 by Saint Winwaloe. It became a Benedictine house in the eighth century. It was attacked and burned by Vikings in 913 and was subsequently rebuilt in stone.

The abbey was suppressed in 1793 during the French Revolution and the goods and premises were sold off.

Second foundation 
In 1950 the site was bought by the Benedictine community of Kerbénéat, who built new premises. The  community formed part of the Subiaco Congregation, since 2013 the Subiaco Cassinese Congregation.

See also 
 List of Carolingian monasteries
 Carolingian architecture
 Gwenhael
 St Tudy

Notes and references

Sources 
 Website of Landévennec Abbey 

Benedictine monasteries in France
Carolingian architecture
Buildings and structures in Finistère
Ruins in Brittany
Tourist attractions in Finistère
Monuments historiques of Finistère